Star Trek: New Voyages, known from 2008 until 2015 as Star Trek: Phase II, was a fan-created science fiction webseries set in the fictional Star Trek universe. The series was designed as a continuation of the original Star Trek (aka ST:TOS or just TOS), beginning in the fifth and final year of the starship Enterprise's "five-year mission." The first episode was released in January 2004, with new episodes released at a rate of about one per year. Production on new episodes halted in June 2016 following the release of new fan film guidelines by CBS/Paramount after they sued the makers of Star Trek: Axanar, with three episodes in post-production left unreleased. The sets constructed for New Voyages were licensed as a 'Studio Set Tour' beginning in July 2016.

The series was the first such show with extensive standing sets, and that it has attracted the talents of a number of professional writers and actors associated with official Star Trek productions, including George Takei reprising his role as Sulu in "World Enough and Time", and Walter Koenig as Chekov in "To Serve All My Days". Eugene Roddenberry Jr., the son of Star Trek creator Gene Roddenberry, served as consulting producer.

The show's episode "World Enough and Time" was nominated for the Hugo Award for Best Dramatic Presentation, Short Form in 2008, alongside episodes of Doctor Who, Torchwood, and Battlestar Galactica, but lost to the Doctor Who episode "Blink."

History 
Star Trek: New Voyages was created by James Cawley and Jack Marshall in April 2003. Jack Marshall came aboard as a producer with the idea to market the series on the internet. The first episode, "Come What May", debuted on the internet in January 2004. The first episodes were filmed on new sets at a long-shuttered car dealership in Port Henry, New York, but production eventually moved to a former Family Dollar store at 112 Montcalm St. in downtown Ticonderoga, New York.  This facility is currently open to the public for tours and is officially licensed by CBS.  Tour information is available at www.startrektour.com

For a five-episode run beginning with "Blood and Fire" in December 2008 and ending with "Kitumba" in December 2013 the series title was changed to Star Trek: Phase II before reverting to New Voyages.

New Voyages creator James Cawley himself portrayed Captain Kirk in the first nine episodes before turning the role over to Brian Gross, choosing to assume a more behind-the-scenes role.  Jack Marshall would go on to work on the award-winning Battlestar Galactica reboot in 2006.

Episodes 

Between January 2004 and May 2016 some 11 full-length episodes and a number of short-form "vignettes" were released (see linked article). Three episodes were scripted by professional Star Trek writers: "To Serve All My Days" by D. C. Fontana; "World Enough and Time" by Marc Scott Zicree; and the two-part "Blood and Fire" by David Gerrold. Two other episodes were based on unfilmed stories for the unproduced 1978 Star Trek Phase II TV series: "The Child" and "Kitumba", neither with the permission of Star Trek rights-holders. Additionally, the episode "Mind-Sifter" was based on a piece of fan fiction from the 1970s.

As of May 2016 several additional episodes were in various stages of pre- or post-production.

Origins, a story based on David Gerrold's original pitch, "The Protracted Man", for Star Trek: The Original Series, was reconceptualized as a Pike-era story featuring the young Cadet James T. Kirk and his father, Commander George Kirk Sr. In January 2021, the incomplete work print for this abandoned episode was rediscovered and uploaded to YouTube (in two sections) by James Cawley.

Cast and crew

Cast

Crew 

The Star Trek: New Voyages pilot episode was produced by James Cawley, Jack Marshall (series director at the time), Pearl Marshall, Max Rem and Jerry Yuen. Episode 1 was produced by James Cawley, Jack Marshall, Pearl Marshall, Max Rem, Amanda Stryker, James Lowe, Jeff Quinn, John Muenchrath and Rod Roddenberry (Gene Roddenberry's son). Episode 2 was produced by James Cawley, Jack Marshall, Erik Goodrich, James Lowe, Jeff Quinn, John Muenchrath and Rod Roddenberry.

The pilot and the first two episodes were directed by Jack Marshall. However, after filming of "To Serve All My Days" it was announced (December 29, 2005) that Marshall would leave the series. Marshall had been offered a position with the visual effects team of Battlestar Galactica and moved from Washington DC in February 2006 to Los Angeles California.  Max Rem continued his participation for another 6 months of post production and then also left the project.

July 2013 saw major announcements for production of the series, with James Cawley leaving the role of Captain Kirk to focus solely on production of the show and original series writer David Gerrold taking on the duties of Executive Showrunner in hopes of producing episodes with greater regularity. Gerrold also personally announced that due to an overwhelming backlog, the show would no longer accept script submissions, nor would any episodes based on existing Star Trek books, comics, stories or other published works be adapted to the series – due to a request by CBS legal in the fall of 2011. Rather, all further episodes will come from original works by previous Star Trek writers or crew associated with the series.

Trek alumni support 
Several past members of the Star Trek cast and crew have expressed support for the project, and even contributed to it.

Guest actors

Other support 

The first episode, "In Harm's Way," features Eugene "Rod" Roddenberry, Jr., the son of Star Trek creator Gene Roddenberry, as a consulting producer. Sam Witwer ("Crashdown" from Battlestar Galactica, Doomsday in Smallville and Galen Marek from Star Wars: The Force Unleashed) is the voice of the Guardian of Forever (credited as "Simon Judas Raye").

For the second episode, "To Serve All My Days," written by original series writer D.C. Fontana, original cast member Walter Koenig reprises his role as Pavel Chekov. Mary-Linda Rapelye (Irina Galliulin in the original series episode "The Way to Eden") appears as an ambassador.

The third episode, "World Enough and Time," was co-authored by Marc Scott Zicree and Michael Reaves. Zicree, who also directed the episode, contributed the stories for the "First Contact" episode of Star Trek: The Next Generation and "Far Beyond the Stars" for Star Trek: Deep Space Nine. Reaves, who co-wrote (with Diane Duane) the "Where No One Has Gone Before" episode of Star Trek: The Next Generation, originally pitched a story to the unproduced Star Trek: Phase II series in which Sulu ages by thirty years, and that story served as the basis for this New Voyages episode. Majel Barrett Roddenberry provided the computer voice in this episode.

David Gerrold (author of TOS episode "The Trouble with Tribbles") has signed on to pen two episodes. One, originally entitled "Blood and Fire," was originally pitched for Star Trek: The Next Generation, but was rejected. Gerrold later claimed the story was rejected because it dealt with homosexuality and AIDS. It was later re-worked as the third book in his Star Wolf series of novels. Denise Crosby guest starred as Natasha Yar's grandmother, Dr. Jenna Yar, in David Gerrold's "Blood and Fire." In addition, Bill Blair guest starred as Commander Blodgett, and The Amazing Race host Phil Keoghan made a cameo appearance as Admiral Keoghan.

Legal status and controversy
Like all fan-films, New Voyages existed at the whim of the Star Trek franchise owners CBS (and previously Paramount Pictures), which previously tolerated the distribution of fan-created material as long as no attempt was made to profit from it.

This tolerance was tested in early 2012 when New Voyages announced that they would film "He Walked Among Us," an unproduced script that Norman Spinrad had sold to the original series. But when CBS claimed ownership of the material, the plans were canceled. CBS had not protested over the series's use of "Blood and Fire", which had been written for Star Trek: The Next Generation; "The Child", and "Kitumba", which had been similarly developed in the late 1970s for the aborted series Star Trek: Phase II, or Mind-Sifter published by Bantam Books, because they were written before the Star Trek movies directed by JJ Abrams were in production. ("The Child" was produced for "Star Trek: The Next Generation.) CBS wants to keep all material it has previously purchased or licensed in any way as possible work to be drawn on for future licensed films.

New Voyages''' legal status was ultimately decided in 2016 following the release of new Star Trek fan film guidelines (in response to the Prelude to Axanar controversy) which forbid the production of all Star Trek fan series and any fan productions that included staff who had worked on or appeared in official Star Trek works. This included much of the staff and cast of New Voyages, including creator James Cawley (who cameos in the 2009 Star Trek film). Production on New Voyages was halted in response, with three episodes in various states of production left unfinished. Following this, the sets for New Voyages were licensed by CBS to serve as the Star Trek: Original Series Set Tour.

 Production notes 
The pilot episode, "Come What May", begins with the late-1960s NBC "In Living Color" sequence. It ends, as did the 1960s episodes, with the animated Desilu Productions logo, with no mention of Paramount. Starting with "Enemy: Starfleet", the series uses the late-60s CBS color opening (reflecting the series' current ownership by CBS Television Studios) and ends with the logo of Cawley Entertainment Company, Cawley's production company.

Inspired by the Star Trek: The Next Generation episode "Lower Decks", James Cawley and Carlos Pedraza had plans in 2007 to develop a series of stories called First Voyages to show "what it’s like to be a 'grunt' on a starship", and with Peter Kirk (Bobby Rice) as the center of these stories focusing on a group of friends from the academy. Another character would be Xon, which had been developed for Star Trek: Phase II around 1977. A pilot episode, "Pomp and Circumstance" would be a New Voyages episode that would spin off into its own series.Though eight episodes were charted, the series didn't materialize. But some components were incorporated into New Voyages, such as Peter Kirk and Xon in "Blood and Fire" and a CGI-model of a Klingon "Bird of Prey" which was used in "To Serve All My Days".

 Awards 

See also
Star Trek fan productionsStar Trek Continues is another fan made series also modeled on the original Star Trek series

 References 

 External links ''

2004 web series debuts
New Voyages
Star Trek web series
Star Trek: Phase II